A callable bond (also called redeemable bond) is a type of bond (debt security) that allows the issuer of the bond to retain the privilege of redeeming the bond at some point before the bond reaches its date of maturity. In other words, on the call date(s), the issuer has the right, but not the obligation, to buy back the bonds from the bond holders at a defined call price. Technically speaking, the bonds are not really bought and held by the issuer but are instead cancelled immediately.

The call price will usually exceed the par or issue price. In certain cases, mainly in the high-yield debt market, there can be a substantial call premium.  

Thus, the issuer has an option which it pays for by offering a higher coupon rate. If interest rates in the market have gone down by the time of the call date, the issuer will be able to refinance its debt at a cheaper level and so will be incentivized to call the bonds it originally issued. Another way to look at this interplay is that, as interest rates go down, the present values of the bonds go up; therefore, it is advantageous to buy the bonds back at par value.

With a callable bond, investors have the benefit of a higher coupon than they would have had with a non-callable bond. On the other hand, if interest rates fall, the bonds will likely be called and they can only invest at the lower rate. This is comparable to selling (writing) an option — the option writer gets a premium up front, but has a downside if the option is exercised.

The largest market for callable bonds is that of issues from government sponsored entities. They own many mortgages and mortgage-backed securities. In the U.S., mortgages are usually fixed rate, and can be prepaid early without cost, in contrast to the norms in other countries. If rates go down, many home owners will refinance at a lower rate. As a consequence, the agencies lose assets. By issuing numerous callable bonds, they have a natural hedge, as they can then call their own issues and refinance at a lower rate.

The price behaviour of a callable bond is the opposite of that of puttable bond. Since call option and put option are not mutually exclusive, a bond may have both options embedded.

Pricing

 price of callable bond = price of straight bond – price of call option;
 Price of a callable bond is always lower than the price of a straight bond because the call option adds value to an issuer.
 Yield on a callable bond is higher than the yield on a straight bond.

References

External links
Bonds 2000
Callable Bond: Definition 

Bonds (finance)
Options (finance)
Embedded options